Alagappa Government Arts College, is a co-educational arts and science college located in Karaikudi of Sivaganga District in Tamil Nadu, India. Also called as Alagappa arts college

History
The college was started in 11 August 1947 by Dr. Alagappa Chettiar with the motive of providing education to the underdeveloped areas in and around Karaikudi. It was originally started as a private college under the University of Madras. Subsequently, it underwent a transition in 1985 and became a Government of Tamil Nadu college affiliated to Madurai Kamaraj University.

Academic programmes
Alagappa College offers undergraduates and postgraduate programmes in arts and science affiliated to the Alagappa University. The college has been accredited by National Assessment and Accreditation Council with a "B" Grade.

Notable alumni
 D Pandian, Politician Ex MP. He was State secretary of Tamilnadu CPI

References

External links

Arts colleges in India
Education in Sivaganga district
Karaikudi
Educational institutions established in 1947
1947 establishments in India
Colleges affiliated to Alagappa University
Academic institutions formerly affiliated with the University of Madras